In seven-dimensional geometry, a truncated 7-simplex is a convex uniform 7-polytope, being a truncation of the regular 7-simplex.

There are unique 3 degrees of truncation. Vertices of the truncation 7-simplex are located as pairs on the edge of the 7-simplex. Vertices of the bitruncated 7-simplex are located on the triangular faces of the 7-simplex. Vertices of the tritruncated 7-simplex are located inside the tetrahedral cells of the 7-simplex.

Truncated 7-simplex 

In seven-dimensional geometry, a truncated 7-simplex is a convex uniform 7-polytope, being a truncation of the regular 7-simplex.

Alternate names
 Truncated octaexon (Acronym: toc) (Jonathan Bowers)

Coordinates 

The vertices of the truncated 7-simplex can be most simply positioned in 8-space as permutations of (0,0,0,0,0,0,1,2). This construction is based on facets of the truncated 8-orthoplex.

Images

Bitruncated 7-simplex

Alternate names
 Bitruncated octaexon (acronym: bittoc) (Jonathan Bowers)

Coordinates 
The vertices of the bitruncated 7-simplex can be most simply positioned in 8-space as permutations of (0,0,0,0,0,1,2,2). This construction is based on facets of the bitruncated 8-orthoplex.

Images

Tritruncated 7-simplex

Alternate names
 Tritruncated octaexon (acronym: tattoc) (Jonathan Bowers)

Coordinates 
The vertices of the tritruncated 7-simplex can be most simply positioned in 8-space as permutations of (0,0,0,0,1,2,2,2). This construction is based on facets of the tritruncated 8-orthoplex.

Images

Related polytopes 
These three polytopes are from a set of 71 uniform 7-polytopes with A7 symmetry.

See also
List of A7 polytopes

Notes

References
 H.S.M. Coxeter: 
 H.S.M. Coxeter, Regular Polytopes, 3rd Edition, Dover New York, 1973 
 Kaleidoscopes: Selected Writings of H.S.M. Coxeter, edited by F. Arthur Sherk, Peter McMullen, Anthony C. Thompson, Asia Ivic Weiss, Wiley-Interscience Publication, 1995,  
 (Paper 22) H.S.M. Coxeter, Regular and Semi Regular Polytopes I, [Math. Zeit. 46 (1940) 380-407, MR 2,10]
 (Paper 23) H.S.M. Coxeter, Regular and Semi-Regular Polytopes II, [Math. Zeit. 188 (1985) 559-591]
 (Paper 24) H.S.M. Coxeter, Regular and Semi-Regular Polytopes III, [Math. Zeit. 200 (1988) 3-45]
 Norman Johnson Uniform Polytopes, Manuscript (1991)
 N.W. Johnson: The Theory of Uniform Polytopes and Honeycombs, Ph.D. 
  x3x3o3o3o3o3o - toc, o3x3x3o3o3o3o - roc, o3o3x3x3o3o3o - tattoc

External links 
 Polytopes of Various Dimensions
 Multi-dimensional Glossary

7-polytopes